Carol Jean Vorderman,  HonFIET (born 24 December 1960) is a British media personality, best known for appearing on the game show Countdown for 26 years from 1982 until 2008, as a newspaper columnist and nominal author of educational and diet books, and hosting the annual Pride of Britain awards. 

Vorderman's career began in 1982 when she joined Channel 4 game show Countdown. She appeared on the show with Richard Whiteley from 1982 until his death in 2005, and subsequently with Des Lynam and Des O'Connor, before leaving in 2008. While appearing on Countdown, Vorderman began presenting other shows for various broadcasters including Better Homes and The Pride of Britain Awards for ITV, as well as guest hosting shows such as Have I Got News for You, The Sunday Night Project and Lorraine. She has written books on detox diets.

Vorderman was a presenter of ITV's Loose Women from 2011 until 2014.

Early life and education
Vorderman was born in Bedford, Bedfordshire, the youngest of three children of Dutch father, Anton Vorderman (1920–2007), and a Welsh mother, Edwina Jean Davies (1928–2017).

Her parents separated three weeks after her birth, and her mother took the family back to her home town of Prestatyn, Denbighshire, North Wales, where Vorderman and her siblings, Anton and Trixie, grew up in a one-parent household. Vorderman did not see her father again until she was 42. In 1970, her mother married Italian Armido Rizzi. The couple separated ten years later. Vorderman's father remarried; his wife died in the early 1990s.

Vorderman was educated at Blessed Edward Jones Catholic High School in nearby Rhyl. In 1978, aged 17, she went to read engineering at Sidney Sussex College, Cambridge. She left with a third-class degree, a result which she has described as having been "disappointing". 

Vorderman did not trace the Dutch side of her family until 2007 (as part of the BBC genealogy programme Who Do You Think You Are?). It was only then that she discovered that her father had been an active member of the Dutch resistance during the Nazi occupation. He died while the programme was being filmed. Her great-grandfather Adolphe Vorderman played a key role in the discovery of vitamins.

Early career
Vorderman initially found employment as a junior civil engineer at Dinorwig Power Station in Llanberis, Wales, and later as a graduate management trainee in Leeds. In her spare time, she was briefly a backing singer with friend Lindsay Forrest in the Leeds-based pop group Dawn Chorus and the Blue Tits, fronted by radio DJ Liz Kershaw during the early 1980s. The group recorded, among other songs, a version of The Undertones' hit Teenage Kicks (one of the tracks Vorderman had to identify during the "intros round" when she appeared on Never Mind the Buzzcocks in December 2009 – the series often includes questions from contestants' pasts). During 1984–85 she made regular appearances on the Peter Levy show on Radio Aire, appearing mid-morning to read a story for pre-school children.

In the mid-1980s, Vorderman worked part-time in the Information Services Department of the UK Atomic Energy Authority, principally in the production of in-house video programmes.

Television career

Countdown

1982–2008
Vorderman's mother noticed a newspaper advertisement asking for "a woman with good mathematical skills"  to appear as co-host on a quiz show for the fledgling fourth terrestrial channel. She submitted an application on behalf of her daughter, then aged 21. Vorderman appeared on Countdown from the show's inception in 1982 until 2008. Initially, Vorderman's only contribution to the show was the numbers game, and she formed part of a five-person presentation team, billed as one of the "vital statisticians" along with Linda Barrett. However, over the following years, the team was pared down, and Vorderman began handling tiles for both the letters and numbers games. Vorderman thus became a new type of game show hostess, revealing her intellectual ability by carrying out fast and accurate arithmetic calculations during the numbers game to reach an exact solution if neither contestant was able to do so. Her lasting success on the show led to her becoming one of the highest-paid women in Britain, ultimately earning her an estimated £1 million per year.

After Richard Whiteley
In June 2005, the producers of Countdown asked Vorderman if she wanted to fill the role of main presenter vacated by the recently deceased Richard Whiteley. Vorderman declined, and a search for a new presenter began while the show went into a four-month hiatus.  In October 2005, Des Lynam replaced Whiteley and co-hosted with Vorderman. In January 2007 Des O'Connor replaced Lynam; Vorderman continued to co-host the show.

On 25 July 2008, after 26 unbroken years with the show, it was announced that Vorderman was stepping down from Countdown. She later said she had resigned after failing to agree terms with Channel 4 for a new contract, and it was reported that she had been asked to take a cut of 90% from her previous salary, estimated as £900,000. She had considered leaving the show when the show's original host Richard Whiteley died in 2005, but remained on the show when Lynam took over, and until 2008 when his eventual replacement O'Connor announced he was also to step down as the show's host. Vorderman and O'Connor both left the show in December 2008.

Vorderman recorded her last Countdown show on 13 November 2008 which was broadcast on 12 December 2008. Both of her children were in the audience, together with many of the previous guests from "Dictionary Corner". After the prizegiving at the end of the show, Des O'Connor was presented with a bouquet of flowers by the show's lexicographer Susie Dent, and Vorderman received one from Gyles Brandreth. She was too moved to complete her farewells. A special show, One Last Consonant, Please Carol, hosted by Brandreth and featuring Vorderman's highs and lows during the 26 years of the show, was also filmed and transmitted just before her final Countdown appearance. After leaving Countdown, Vorderman continued to contribute her column to the British magazine Reveal.

Channel 4 admitted in 2009 that all Countdown presenters had always worn earpieces, and that producers would "sometimes supply extra ideas as there are often multiple options to ensure viewers are given the best possible answers." A source close to Vorderman denied that she had worn an earpiece or cheated in her mental arithmetic answers.

Loose Women

In July 2011, Vorderman and Sally Lindsay were tipped for roles on Loose Women following ITV's decision to axe Kate Thornton and Zoë Tyler from the programme. This was later confirmed, with Vorderman presenting her first live show on 5 September 2011. From September 2011 to June 2013, Vorderman and fellow Loose Women host Andrea McLean hosted two to three shows per week. However, after the show returned from its summer break in September 2013, she began to host one episode per week, with McLean anchoring the remaining four. On 3 October 2013, it was announced that former Loose Women presenter Kaye Adams would be returning to the show later in the year and Ruth Langsford would join the panel in January 2014. Adams, Langsford and Andrea McLean hosted the show in rotation, with Vorderman remaining as an occasional presenter on the programme, usually presenting one episode a fortnight.

On 14 July 2014, Vorderman announced her departure as a presenter on Loose Women. Vorderman explained:

Other television work
Vorderman is the presenter of the annual Pride of Britain Awards, which are televised by ITV. She began hosting the awards when they were introduced in 1999.

In 2004, Vorderman took part in the second series of Strictly Come Dancing, partnered with professional dancer Paul Killick. She was the second celebrity to be eliminated from the show. She guest presented Have I Got News for You in 2004 and 2006 and also presented an episode of  The Sunday Night Project.

Vorderman guest presented 15 episodes of Lorraine in 2011. She presented the ITV Food show Food Glorious Food in 2013.

In March 2013, Vorderman recorded an ITV gameshow pilot called Revolution. On 29 June 2013, it was announced that the show had been "scrapped" by ITV.

In 2016, Vorderman finished in eighth place in the sixteenth series of I'm a Celebrity...Get Me Out of Here!

On 7 April 2020, Vorderman appeared on The Great Stand Up to Cancer Bake Off and won.

Broadcast on S4C on 19 April 2020, Vorderman took part in the show  ('Language Road Trip') and, with the help of Owain Wyn Evans, learned Welsh and completed various challenges in the language. An extra episode,  ('Language Road Trip: Christmas') was broadcast at the end of 2020, interviewing each of the celebrities about whether they were still making use of their Welsh and the opportunities they had had to use Welsh during lockdown.

Filmography

Television

Outside television

Journalism
Vorderman has had newspaper columns in The Daily Telegraph, and in the Daily Mirror on Internet topics. She has written books on Detox diets. Her No. 1 bestseller was Detox For Life, produced in collaboration with Ko Chohan and Anita Bean and published by Virgin Books, which sold over a million copies.

Many school textbooks have been published under her name, chiefly by Dorling Kindersley in series such as English Made Easy, Maths Made Easy, Science Made Easy and How to Pass National Curriculum Maths.

Commercial ventures
Vorderman also expanded her business ventures, launching a number of Sudoku products. In March 2007, she launched a brain-training game called Carol Vorderman's Mind Aerobics together with BSkyB. Also in 2007, she released a video game for PlayStation 2 in the United States entitled Carol Vorderman's Sudoku.

In 2007, Vorderman did TV commercials for the frozen food chain Farmfoods – advertising "Chippy Chips for £1" and "Cadbury's Cones for 99p".

In the autumn of 2008, soon after she completed her final regular Countdown show, Vorderman announced a new commercial venture, her own property development and sales company that would specialise in overseas holiday and retirement homes in the Caribbean, the Bahamas and Spain. It was called Carol Vorderman's Overseas Homes Ltd. She saw the company as a natural extension of her own experiences in buying and selling properties over recent years and was aiming at a target market of "families aged 35 plus". However, because of the financial crisis of 2007–2008, the venture proved short-lived. During March 2009 Vorderman publicly withdrew her name from the firm, which suspended trading soon afterwards.

On 2 March 2010, Vorderman publicly launched her new commercial venture of an online mathematics coaching system for 4- to 12-year-old children under the name of the MathsFactor.

Endorsement controversy
Vorderman had maintained a long-standing endorsement of the debt consolidation company FirstPlus, an association that ceased in 2007. In 2006, the charity Credit Action attempted to highlight the potential dangers of debt consolidation, calling on Vorderman to stop giving First Plus credibility. Her agent responded that Vorderman had no intention of curtailing the contract for a service which was perfectly legal and offered by an excellent company. When interviewed by The Daily Telegraph in November 2008 Vorderman herself responded with:"The secured loans market was criticised and it was pertinent to pick me out, because I was a face. I advertised FirstPlus for 10 years. We had something like £1.5billion out on loan and until a matter of months ago there were no repossessions. When that programme [BBC's Real Story] was made, [there were] no repossessions. Did they say that? Funnily enough, no."

Other activities

On 18 September 2010, Vorderman, a Catholic, co-presented events leading up to the Papal Vigil in Hyde Park, alongside author Frank Cottrell Boyce.

On 2 June 2012, Vorderman named a Class 91 (91110)  "Battle of Britain Memorial Flight" at the National Railway Museum as part of the Railfest 2012 Event.

In 2014, Vorderman qualified for a private pilot's licence and announced that she planned to fly solo around the world. She named her plane Mildred after Mildred, Mrs Victor Bruce, a British record-breaking racing motorist, speedboat racer and aviator in the 1920s and 1930s, who Vorderman has described as "my heroine. She’s one of the most incredible women of the last century".

On 20 November 2014, Vorderman accepted the appointment of ambassador to the Royal Air Force Air Cadets.

Vorderman has also taken up learning the Welsh language and has been using the Say Something in Welsh online course. In early 2020, she said "I've been learning Welsh ... and I love it. It's taken me back to my roots".

In 2022 Vorderman was praised by The Herald as the "real leader of the opposition" after criticising members of the government for exploiting their positions for personal gain.

Personal life
Vorderman is a Catholic. She was first married in 1985 at age 24 to Christopher Mather, a Royal Navy officer, but the marriage lasted only twelve months. Her second marriage was to management consultant Patrick King in 1990 at age 30. Vorderman had two children, Katie (b. 1992) and Cameron (b. 1997), with King; the couple separated in 2000.

After meeting at a Christmas party in 1999, Vorderman and Des Kelly lived together in London from 2001, also using their other house in Glandore, West Cork, Ireland. After five years together, Vorderman and Kelly separated in December 2006, publicly announcing the amicable split in January 2007 and after a brief reconciliation in Bristol according to reports.

As of 2014, Vorderman shares her Bristol home with her two children. Vorderman lived with or very near to her mother all her life, until her mother’s death in 2017.

On 6 June 2020, she complained in a number of UK newspapers of being harassed by photographers in the road outside her home.

Honours and awards
Vorderman was honoured as a Member of the Order of the British Empire (MBE) for "services to broadcasting" in the Queen's Birthday Honours in June 2000. She has been elected as an Honorary Fellow of Bangor University in North Wales and, in 2000, received an Honorary Degree (MA) from the University of Bath.

Vorderman was voted UK Female Rear of the Year in 2011. In 2014, she became the first celebrity to win the award twice.

In November 2021, Vorderman was awarded an Honorary Fellowship by the Institution of Engineering and Technology in recognition of her outstanding contribution to the engineering profession.

Political views
Vorderman has been critical of the Labour Party's education policies. In February 2009, it was announced that she was to head a task force established by the Conservative Party to look at the teaching of mathematics. David Cameron commented, "Carol has got a passion for maths. We have all seen that on Countdown with her brilliant mental arithmetic and she is going to lead this task force so we can get the answers right."

In an appearance on Question Time in March 2010, Vorderman was critical of all three major parties for hypocrisy in taking donations from non-domiciled taxpayers.

Charity work

Vorderman is a patron of the Cleft Lip and Palate Association (CLAPA) (her older brother, Anton, was born with a cleft lip and palate). In 2005, she was the winner of Ant and Dec's Gameshow Marathon. As part of its 50th anniversary celebrations ITV ran a series of the nation's favourite game shows featuring celebrities competing to become Gameshow Marathon winner and raise money for the charity of their choice. As series winner Vorderman won £30,000 for CLAPA and £30,000 for Big Money, a grand total of £60,000 for CLAPA. In November 2011 Carol also appeared in the music video for New Vorder's 'Carol O Carol' (playing herself) a song written by Jim Salveson in 1999 about his love for Carol Vorderman. The video is directed by Tim Cocker and was released on 28 November 2011 in aid of the charity CLAPA.

Vorderman appeared in a short film entitled 'Run for the future' which promotes prostate cancer awareness and a charity run held every year on the Bristol Downs to raise funds for the BUI prostate appeal. She has also taken part in the Great North Run on several occasions to raise money for Marie Curie Cancer Care. This was in memory of Richard Whiteley's sister Helen, who died of the disease.

Vorderman is an active supporter and advocate of the RAF Association charity, appearing at airshows and taking part in other fundraising events.

Videos and published writings
 Carol Vorderman's Pop Music Times Tables, 1990
 Carol Vorderman's How to Write a Perfect Letter, 1991
 How Mathematics Works, 1996
 Carol Vorderman's Guide to the Internet (written with Rob Young), 1998
 Carol Vorderman's How to Do Sudoku, 2005
 Carol Vorderman's Massive Book of Sudoku, 2005
 Eat Yourself Clever, 2008
 Carol Vorderman's Guide to Maths
 Carol Vorderman's Detox Diet
 It All Counts, 2010

See also
 List of I'm a Celebrity...Get Me Out of Here! (British TV series) contestants
 List of Strictly Come Dancing contestants

References

External links

 
 Carol Vorderman (BBC Radio Wales)
 Debrett's People of Today
 Carol Vorderman at Biogs.com

1960 births
Living people
20th-century Welsh writers
21st-century Welsh writers
20th-century Welsh women writers
21st-century Welsh women writers
Alumni of Sidney Sussex College, Cambridge
Welsh people of Dutch descent
Welsh columnists
Welsh women columnists
Welsh television presenters
Welsh Roman Catholics
GMTV presenters and reporters
People from Bedford
People from Prestatyn
People educated at Blessed Edward Jones RC High School
Members of the Order of the British Empire
Mensans
Royal Air Force officers holding honorary commissions
Countdown (game show)
I'm a Celebrity...Get Me Out of Here! (British TV series) participants
BBC Radio Wales presenters
The Daily Telegraph people
Daily Mirror people
Alternative detoxification promoters
British women pop singers
Yorkshire Television
People associated with Bangor University
People associated with the University of Bath